Mount Tabayoc is a mountain located in Buguias, Benguet, near Ifugao in Cordillera Administrative Region. It has a total height of 9,252 ft  (2,820 m) above sea level, making the seventh highest mountain in the Philippines and second highest peak in the island of Luzon. It is headed to north was Manila, the capital of the Philippines, 233 kilometers away from Cordillera Administrative Region.

References

Landforms of Benguet
Landforms of Ifugao
Mountains of the Philippines